List of annual foot races held in California, sorted by region:

Anaheim, California
 Disneyland 1/2 Marathon, 10k, 5k
 Tinker Bell 1/2 Marathon, 10k, 5k
 garbage Super Heroes 1/2 Marathon, 10k, 5k

Arcadia, California
 Santa Anita Derby Day 5K

Avery, California
 Hernia Hill 1/2 Marathon, 10K, 5K

Big Sur, California
 Big Sur International Marathon

Carlsbad, California
 Carlsbad 5000

Cool, California
 Way Too Cool 50K

Davis, California
 Fleet Feet Davis Mile
 Fleet Feet Labor Day Races 10K, 5K
 Davis Stampede 1/2 Marathon, 10K, 5K
 Davis Turkey Trot 10K, 5K

Death Valley, California
 Badwater Ultramarathon
 Death Valley Trail Marathon, 30K

Elk Grove, California
 Nutrition Fuels Fitness 10K, 5K

Fresno, California
 Two Cities Marathon & Half, Ultra, and Relay

Granite Bay, California
 Rio Del Lago 100 Mile

Huntington Beach, California
 Surf City Marathon (formerly Pacific Shoreline)

Idyllwild, California
 Idyllwild 5K/10K Run and Fitness Walk

Long Beach, California 
 Jet Blue Long Beach Marathon.

Los Angeles, California
 Los Angeles Marathon
 Angeles Crest 100 Mile Endurance Run
 Bell-Jeff Invitational
 Palos Verdes Marathon 
 New Year's Race 1/2 Marathon, 5k 
 Hollywood Half Marathon, 10k, 5k Hollywood Half Marathon Website
 Alive and Running for Suicide Prevention, 5k Alive and Running Website

Mammoth Lakes, California
 Quake & Shake 1/2 Marathon, 10K

Manhattan Beach, California
 Old Hometown Fair 10K

Oceanside, California
 O'side Turkey Trot 5 Mile and 5K

Paso Robles, California
 Wine Vine Run Half Marathon 5K 

 Redding Marathon, Relay and 5k

Redondo Beach, California
 Redondo Beach Super Bowl Sunday 10K/5K

Sacramento, California
 California International Marathon 
 Paul Reese Memorial Clarksburg Country Run 
 Runnin’ for Rhett 10K, 5K

San Diego, California
 America's Finest City 1/2 Marathon, 5K
 Rock 'n' Roll Marathon 
 San Diego Mud Run 
 Costume Party Run - 1/2 Marathon, 5K Costume Party Run Website
SURFING MADONNA "SAVE THE OCEAN" 1K/5K/10K ON THE BEACH RUN/WALK $22,000 PRIZE MONEY EVENT WEBSITE

San Francisco Bay Area

Alameda County
Berkeley:
 Berkeley Half Marathon, 10K, 5K 
Castro Valley:
 Dick Collins Firetrails 50 Mile
 Eden Medical Center Run to the Lake 10K, 5K
Oakland:
 The Town's Half Marathon, 5K 
 Oakland Running Festival: Marathon, Half Marathon, 5K

Contra Costa County
Danville:
 Devil Mountain Run, 5K, 10K 
Mount Diablo State Park:
 Mount Diablo Summer Trail Run 50K, 25K, 8K
San Ramon:
 Primo's Run for Education Half-Marathon, 5K 
Walnut Creek:
 Forma Gym Turkey Trot, 5K, 10K 
Lafayette:
 Lafayette Reservoir Run, 5K, 10K (last Sunday in October every year)

Marin County
 Marin County Half Marathon, 10K & 5K 
 Golden Gate Headlands Marathon, 1/2 Marathon, 7 Mile

Angel Island:
 Angel Island New Year's 8K, 16K, 25K, 50K

Mill Valley:
 Dipsea Race

Muir Beach:
 Headlands 50k

Sausalito:
 Miwok 100K Trail Race

Stinson Beach:
 Muir Woods Marathon, 25K, 7 Mile (canceled for 2021)
 Stinson Beach Marathon, 25K, 7 Mile

San Francisco
 Allstate Hot Chocolate 15k/5k Allstate Hot Chocolate Website
 Awesome '80s Run 5K Awesome '80s Run Website
 Across the Bay 12K 
 Bay to Breakers 12K 
 Bridge to Bridge 
 Coastal 5k & Festival 
 Embarcadero 10K
 Golden Gate Park 10K
 Kaiser Permanente San Francisco 1/2 Marathon, 5K
 King Oscar Presidio Trails Run 5K/10K
 Mermaid San Francisco 5K/10K 
 Mission Rock 5K
 Nike Women's Marathon 
 Polo Field 5K
 Run For Arctic Awareness 10K
 Run Wild (formerly Run to the Far Side) 
 San Francisco Marathon
 Statuto Race 8K
 Walt Stack 10K
 Windmill 10K

San Luis Obispo County
San Luis Obispo:
 San Luis Obispo Marathon, Half Marathon, and 5K (SLO Marathon)
 Run For Music 5k/10k (Run For Music)

Paso Robles:
 Wine Vine Run Half Marathon 5K

San Mateo County
Pacifica, California:
 Coastal 5k Family Fun Run & Festival http://pacresourcecenter.org/blog/?p=459
Pescadero:
 Artichoke 1/2 Marathon, 10K

San Mateo:
 President's Day Castaway 10K, 5K
 Laurel Family Fun Run, 5K Register Online

South San Francisco:
 Thanksgiving Fun Run & Stride, 5K

Santa Clara County
Cupertino:
 Stevens Creek 50K

Morgan Hill:
 Mushroom Mardi Gras Festival and Run (10K and 5K) Saturday of Memorial Weekend May 26, 2012, 

Mountain View:
 Mermaid Mountain View Run 5K,10K, Half Marathon 
 Human Race 10K, 5K (cancelled as of 2009) 

Palo Alto:
 Moonlight Run 
 Skyline Ridge 1/2 Marathon, 10K

San Jose:
 Quicksilver 50 Mile, 50K, 25K 
 Silicon Valley Turkey Trot

Sonoma County
Jenner:
 Salt Point 50K, 26K, 11K

Santa Clarita, California
Santa Clarita Marathon, Half Marathon, and 5k 
College of the Canyons Cross Country Summer Series 
Independence Day 5k 
Fight It! 5k

Santa Cruz, California
 Firecracker 5K/10K 
 Mothers Day Run/Walk for Shelter 
 Nisene Marks Marathon, ½ Marathon 
 Race Thru The Redwoods 
 Run by the Sea 
 Santa Cruz ½ Marathon, 10K 
 Surfer's Path 5K/10K 
 Surfer's Path ½ Marathon, Marathon 
 Surfer's Path Hang 10/5 
 Superbowl Run 
 Turkey Trot 
 Wharf to Wharf

Sierra Nevada, California
 Western States Endurance Run
 Lake Tahoe Marathon, ½ Marathon, 10k, 5k

South Lake Tahoe, California
 Lake Tahoe Marathon, ½ Marathon, 10k, 5k

Ventura, California
 Twilight's Last Gleaming Cross Country Challenge 4 Miles

References

External links
 California Running Race Calendar, RunGuides.com
 California races by month, Running in the USA

Foot races, annual
Annual